Mohammed Qasim Majid (born 6 December 1996) is an Iraqi footballer who plays as a midfielder for Al-Quwa Al-Jawiya in the Iraqi Premier League.

International career
On 7 June 2019, Qasim made his first international cap with Iraq against Tunisia in an international friendly. On 26 November 2019, he scored his first and second international goals against Qatar in a 2–1 win for Iraq in the 24th Arabian Gulf Cup.

International goals

Scores and results list Iraq's goal tally first.

Style of Play
Qasim is a left footer capable of playing as a number 10 or as a winger. He is known for quick & agile dribbling, accurate passing and for his capability of incredibly accurate and powerful long shots.

Honours

Club
Al-Quwa Al-Jawiya
AFC Cup: 2018
Al-Shorta
Iraqi Premier League: 2021–22

Individual
Soccer Iraq Player of the Year: 2021

References

External links

1996 births
Living people
Iraqi footballers
Iraq international footballers
Association football midfielders
Al-Shorta SC players
AFC Cup winning players
People from Najaf